Du Wenxiang (Chinese: 杜文翔; born 31 October 1991 in Shandong) is a Chinese football player who currently plays for China League Two side Zibo Cuju.

Club career
Du Wenxiang was promoted to Chongqing Lifan's first team squad in 2010. On 16 October 2010, he made his debut for Chongqing Lifan in the 2010 Chinese Super League against Jiangsu Sainty, coming on as a substitute for José Filho Duarte in the 83rd minute.
On 17 February 2013, Du was loaned to China League One side Beijing BIT until 31 December 2013. He transferred to Dalian Transcendence in March 2014. After two seasons he would gain promotion with the club. 

On 18 January 2017, Du moved to League Two side Sichuan Longfor. He would establish himself as a regular within the team and go on to win 2018 China League Two division title with the club.

Career statistics 
Statistics accurate as of match played 31 December 2020.

Honours

Club
Sichuan Longfor
China League Two: 2018

References

External links

1991 births
Living people
Chinese footballers
Footballers from Shandong
Chongqing Liangjiang Athletic F.C. players
Dalian Transcendence F.C. players
Sichuan Longfor F.C. players
Chinese Super League players
China League One players
Association football forwards